The Blues Brothers: Jukebox Adventure is a video game based on the band The Blues Brothers and a sequel to The Blues Brothers. The game was released for the Super Nintendo Entertainment System in 1993 (as The Blues Brothers) and for IBM PC compatibles and Game Boy in 1994. An Amiga port was developed and even reviewed by several videogame magazines, but never released.

Gameplay 
The characters have to gather vinyl discs to throw them at enemies and find the jukebox at the end of each level to make it to the next one. The game can be played by two players simultaneously, and the scrolling screen keeps focus on both characters by pushing the one that gets behind.

Each version has different soundtracks. While the SNES and MS-DOS versions used a combination of Blues Brothers licensed music with original compositions by Dimitris Yerasimos, the Game Boy version has a soundtrack composed by Thorsten Mitschele.

Notes

References

External links 
 

1993 video games
Super Nintendo Entertainment System games
DOS games
Game Boy games
Cancelled Amiga games
Video games based on musicians
Platform games
The Blues Brothers
Titus Software games
Video games developed in France
Band-centric video games